The Athletics at the 2016 Summer Paralympics – Women's 100 metres T42 event at the 2016 Paralympic Games took place on 17 September 2016, at the Estádio Olímpico João Havelange.

Heats

Heat 1 
11:56 17 September 2016:

Heat 2 
12:02 17 September 2016:

Final 
19:52 17 September 2016:

Notes

Athletics at the 2016 Summer Paralympics